Alan Walsh is the name of:

 Alan Walsh (footballer) (born 1956), retired English footballer
 Alan Walsh (physicist) (1916–1998), British physicist
 Allan Walsh (Australian politician) (1940–2013), former Australian politician
 Allan B. Walsh (1874–1953), American politician from New Jersey